Jaryd Atadero was a three-year-old American boy who went missing on October 2, 1999, while hiking with a Christian social group on Big South Trail, a part of the Arapaho & Roosevelt National Forest in Colorado. His partial remains were found by two businessmen on a hiking trip on May 6, 2003. Atadero's disappearance and killing remain a cold case and anomaly noted for the fact that the boy's cause of death has never been officially classified. While often reported as a mountain lion attack, experts on felids have argued that the discovered remains do not meet the typical patterns of a mountain lion attack. Other experts believed that Atadero had been the victim of an abduction and murder. Owing in part to the sensationalism surrounding the Colorado case of child glitz pageant contestant JonBenét Ramsey, the media was heavily involved during the search of Atadero.

Early life
Jaryd Atadero was the three-year-old son of Allyn Atadero and Stacie Mckissick, and had an older sister, then six-year-old Josallyn Atadero. Allyn Atadero was a divorcee raising both children, and he had recently joined the Christian Singles Network group, a local religious club. The club was known to have aided Allyn in daily life as a single father, and the Atadero Family became heavily intertwined with group activities among the club. Allyn himself, a physical education teacher at a local junior high school, found comfort in the religious devotion.

Disappearance 
In October of 1999, Allyn was staying with his two children in the Poudre River Resort, a commercial hotel owned by Allyn and his twin brother, Arlyn Atadero. Jaryd and Josallyn were anxious to go on an excursion to the nearby state fish hatchery with members of the Christian Singles Network group, something that Allyn had initially been reluctant about, but when the group said they would only be going to the hatchery, he consented, trusting the group to keep their word. At some point during the hatchery trip, the 11 members of the group plus Josallyn and Jaryd decided to take an early afternoon hike up the Big South Trail, 15 miles west of the resort. It is unclear why this decision was made, although Allyn noted that the beautiful weather may have been a factor, stating that it was "one of those gorgeous fall bluebird days in the mountains of Colorado." Reports vary widely on the exact events that occurred on the trail leading up to Jaryd's disappearance. It is generally declared that the group split into faster and slower-paced groups on the trail, and that Jaryd ran ahead of the group he was with. The boy reportedly stopped to chat with two fishermen, who told investigators that they didn’t think much about Jaryd being alone, since they had seen the Christian Singles Network group about 50 to 80 feet down the trail, unaware that Jaryd was not related to any of them. The last the fishermen saw of Jaryd, he was walking rapidly up the trail near adjacent campsites.

The members of the Christian Singles Network group, as well as Josallyn, heard a loud scream not long after this. According to Josallyn, the scream had little context, as it sounded both like "somebody getting attacked or somebody playing with someone... a playful scream, like someone was going up to tag [Jaryd]." The group members searched for Jaryd for roughly an hour, then returned to the resort to inform Allyn about the disappearance. Allyn broke down mentally, getting into his vehicle while beating his own chest and screaming repeatedly, "they lost my baby, they lost my baby." The resort manager called the Larimer County Sheriff’s Office, and a Search and Rescue team was deployed, some of whom comforted Josallyn and allowed her to pet one of the search dogs, named "Apache". Bill Nelson, now a recently retired undersheriff with the Larimer County Sheriff’s Office, was in charge of the search for Jaryd. “Absolutely, I thought we would find him,'” he said. “Yes, it was a young child, but my thought was we should be able to get in there with our people and do what we do and what we have done hundreds of times: find the person. It might take a few hours to find the child crying or hiding someplace nearby, but we would be done before midnight.” Nelson went to his vehicle for a quick nap just before midnight and told his staff to wake him when they found the boy. When he awoke the next morning in the front seat of his pickup truck, he became concerned, realizing that Jaryd still had not been located.

Initial search
An extensive search for Jaryd Atadero took place, but the search itself was hindered by multiple difficulties, including a building media frenzy. Furthermore, the helicopter used in the search for Jaryd crashed, severely injuring the team on-board and destroying the helicopter itself. The Huey UH-1N helicopter from F.E. Warren Air Force Base in Cheyenne, Wyoming, had been the chosen copter for the search. It flew to the Fort Collins-Loveland Municipal Airport to refuel. When the helicopter returned, it struggled with the fuel load and mountain conditions and stalled out, falling 100 feet and crashing up the Big South Trail. Aboard were four members of the Air Force and Mark Sheets, a Loveland resident and Larimer County Search and Rescue member. Sheets wasn’t supposed to be on the flight but had relieved his manager, George Janson, from his shift. Janson suggested Sheets fly with the crew to help the team make ground search plans. According to Sheets, "I said on the intercom that we needed altitude now and (remember) the co-pilot saying, ‘I know but I can’t. We are going in,'” he said. “To me that was code for brace for impact.” Sheets was the only crew member not in a seat. He was on the floor with the door open. He saw the rotors hit the tops of trees and pieces of helicopter spray into the forest. He tried to shut the door, but a severed tree limb came through and struck the Air Force doctor on board, fracturing the doctor’s eye socket. Sheets said the helicopter continued to disintegrate, with the fuselage splitting into three pieces, as it crashed across the trail. The jet engines, still operational, continued to run for several hours until the fuel ran out. The Air Force crew was able to get out of the helicopter, but Sheets was trapped. Nearby search and rescue members ran to the downed helicopter, kicked in a window and managed to pull the then-unconscious Sheets out. Sheets suffered a severe concussion and a 13-inch gash on one leg that left his femur bone exposed. He also suffered three broken vertebrae in his lower back and a broken shoulder. Sheets was emotionally distraught, recalling in a 2017 interview that he had wanted to "do something useful" and help Jaryd. Sheets retired in 2017.

Larimer County Sheriff Justin Smith was a sergeant with the department during the search, and recalled the intensity of media sensationalism surrounding Jaryd's disappearance. TV trucks and newspaper reporters compared the case to the death of local glitz pageant winner JonBenét Ramsey, another Colorado-based child cold case. "I remember from moment one that second day, we quickly realized what we were up against," Smith said.We had searchers down who they were bringing out on stretchers, we had a missing kid overnight, we had the Air Force closing off the crash site. Emotionally it was overwhelming, and you could see it in the eyes of everybody involved. TV satellite trucks, 17 at one time, lined up along Colorado Highway 14 with anchors in fur coats walking around and anybody and everybody calling us for information. Psychics professed to know where searchers could find Jaryd. A bare-footed man with a donkey showed up at the search site, ready to track [Jaryd] down. An American Indian came to perform a ritual, asking the mountain to give up the boy.

Searchers combed river banks and up steep slopes. Dive teams peered into small pools left in the narrow, slow-moving river. A plane made passes overhead, but was unable to locate Jaryd. "It became a tornado, a hurricane, the biggest storm in all of our lives," Allyn Atadero stated. "I was critical of them at the time because when you are in a survival situation, you want everything that can be done to be done, and at times I thought there was so much more they could have done." With no sign of the boy appearing, the search gradually ended, and the case went cold.

Discovery of human remains
In 2003, businessmen Rob Osbourne & Gareth Watts were hiking together in the Poudre Canyon area near the Big South Trail and came across partial human remains, including a brown polar fleece sweater, a pair of blue trousers, and the Disney's Tarzan sneakers that Jaryd had been wearing when he disappeared. Authorities were notified, and further searching revealed a human molar and a large piece of fractured human skull. DNA testing at the time revealed that the remains were 86% likely to be Jaryd's; more modern DNA testing revealed that the remains were 100% Jaryd's. Rather than bury or cremate the remains, Allyn Atadero decided to keep them, creating a shrine to Jaryd out of his old bedroom, kept exactly as it was before he disappeared, with the skull piece kept atop Jaryd's favourite toys and belongings. According to Allyn, "I am at peace and I know I am going to see Jaryd again one of these days. I’m going to look at him at say, 'Jaryd, what happened?' He’s going to look at me and say, 'dad, does it really matter?'" In Allyn's published book, Missing: The Jaryd Atadero Story: A Father Turns Tragedy Into Hope After the 1999 Disappearance of His Son in the Colorado Mountains, he discussed his motivations for keeping Jaryd's skull piece, as well as his religious beliefs aiding him in his decisions surrounding how to best handle the remains and memorial of the boy.

Theories
There are two main theories surrounding the death of Jaryd Atadero.

Mountain Lion 
Although the general consensus of the case is that Jaryd Atadero was killed and eaten by a large animal, presumably a mountain lion, the contention around this theory is strong. According to Allyn, experts on big cats in Colorado had told him that a mountain lion would have attacked the boy's stomach first, aiming for the internal organs, yet Jaryd's sweater showed no signs of such an attack. Moreover, the boy's trousers were turned inside-out, something that a mountain lion would not have done, and the Tarzan sneakers showed only minimal wear, with no sign whatsoever of having been dragged, indicating that a mountain lion could not have dragged the boy's body all the way up the trail that far into the mountains without destroying the sneakers. This being said, mountain lion tracks had been discovered next to Jaryd's tracks in the initial search. According to Allyn Atadero, "[the search team] found some cougar prints coming down toward his tracks, and where the cougar prints and a little person's prints come together, the child's prints disappear." At the time that Allyn had stated this, another initial theory had existed that Jaryd may have slipped and fallen, either getting caught in the rocky terrain and dying from exposure or dying from the fall. This theory has been largely ruled out, although not completely considered implausible by authorities.

Abduction 
One other existing theory is that Jaryd was abducted and murdered by somebody who had captured him, then disposing of the boy's clothing. This was backed up by the note that a human being could have turned the trousers inside-out. The only damage to the trousers had come from rodents and birds yanking away large pieces of the fabric to weave into their nearby nests. Although family and friends were questioned, there was no indication otherwise that anybody, at least anybody immediately known to the Atadero Family, had taken Jaryd.

Claim of being Jaryd 
Allyn Atadero was harassed by a man claiming to be Jaryd himself, and Allyn took out a restraining order on this individual; when the restraining order was violated, the man was arrested. The discovery of Jaryd's remains and the DNA match invalidated the man's claims, and it is believed by authorities that the man was mentally ill or trying to seek attention of some sort. As of 2022, the case remains officially unsolved.

Legacy
Two books have been published surrounding the Jaryd Atadero case, Missing: The Jaryd Atadero Story: A Father Turns Tragedy Into Hope After the 1999 Disappearance of His Son in the Colorado Mountains, and also Missing: When the Son Sets: The Jaryd Atadero Story.

Jaryd Atadero's death prompted Governor Bill Ritter of Colorado to declare September 8 as Recreational Safety Awareness Week in honour of Jaryd Atadero. Allyn Atadero was given the opportunity to give the proclamation from Governor Ritter to assistant principal Lori Perry-Crumrine of Falcon Bluffs Middle School, where Allyn also worked as a teacher.

See also
Death of Azaria Chamberlain
Killing of JonBenét Ramsey
Killing of Maddox Derkosh
List of fatal cougar attacks in North America
List of solved missing person cases
List of unsolved deaths

References

1990s crimes in Colorado
1990s missing person cases
1999 deaths
Crimes in Colorado
Deaths due to animal attacks in the United States
Formerly missing people
Missing person cases in Colorado
Deaths by person in Colorado
Unsolved murders in the United States